The 2011 Big 12 Conference baseball tournament was held at RedHawks Ballpark in Oklahoma City, OK from May 25th to May 29th, 2011. After five years using the round robin tournament setup, the 2011 Big XII Tournament switched back to the format used from 1999 to 2005, which consisted of two separate four-team double-elimination tournaments. The winners of each of those tournaments faced each other in a one-game match for the championship. Missouri and Texas A&M faced each other in the championship game on Sunday, May 29, 2011. Texas A&M beat Missouri 10–9 in 10 innings to win the 2011 Big XII Tournament. As the conference tournament champion Texas A&M earned an automatic bid to the 2011 NCAA Division I baseball tournament. This was the second consecutive year that Texas A&M won the conference tournament in extra innings on a walk-off home run.

Regular Season Standings
Source:

Colorado and Iowa State did not sponsor baseball teams.

Tournament

 * indicates extra-inning game.
Nebraska and Kansas did not make the tournament.

All-Tournament Team

See also
College World Series
2011 College World Series
NCAA Division I Baseball Championship
2011 NCAA Division I baseball tournament
Big 12 Conference baseball tournament

References

2011 Big 12 Tournament

Tournament
Big 12 Conference Baseball Tournament
Big 12 Conference baseball tournament
Big 12 Conference baseball tournament
Baseball competitions in Oklahoma City
College sports tournaments in Oklahoma